Altenburg is a municipality in the district of Horn in Lower Austria, Austria.

It is the location of the important 12C Benedictine Altenburg Abbey.

Population

References

Cities and towns in Horn District